Daphne Hilary Penelope Caine (born 1969) is an English-born Manx politician and former civil servant. She was elected to the House of Keys representing Garff in 2016 and re-elected for the same constituency in 2021. Following the 2021 election, she was elected as Deputy Speaker of the House of Keys. She previously worked on the Isle of Man as a journalist and civil servant.

Biography
Born and raised in Sheffield, England, in 1969, Caine attended King Edward VII School before studying at Stradbroke College, Sheffield. From 1989 to 1996, she worked as a journalist for Isle of Man Newspapers, after which she joined the island's civil service, initially at the Department of Tourism and Leisure, later at the Department of Home Affairs and the Department of Infrastructure, where she concentrated on public transport.

In 2016, she was elected to the Tynwald, where she serves as a Member of House of Keys for Garff as an independent politician. She has served as a political member of the Department for Enterprise since 2016 and was Children's Champion from 2016 to 2018.

Election results

2016

Personal life 
She is married to Christopher Caine, a native of the Isle of Man, with whom she has two children.

References

External links
Daphne Caine's website

1969 births
Living people
Members of the House of Keys 2016–2021
Manx women in politics
People from Sheffield
People educated at King Edward VII School, Sheffield